Myrnohrad, formerly Dymytrov, is a city of oblast significance in Donetsk Oblast (province) of Ukraine. Population: .

The city was previously named after Georgi Dimitrov - a prominent Bulgarian and Soviet communist politician, but was renamed to Myrnohrad during decommunisation in May 2016.

Unlike in most bigger cities in Donetsk Oblast, the separatist Donetsk People's Republic  11 May 2014 referendum on independence was not held in the city.

Demographics
As of the Ukrainian Census of 2001:

Ethnicity
Ukrainians: 64.2%
Russians: 31.3%
Tatars: 0.7%
Belarusians: 0.6%
Armenians: 0.2%

Language
Russian: 71.8%
Ukrainian: 26.0%
Armenian: 0.1%
Belarusian: 0.1%

Economy
The main city employer is a mining company "Myrnohradvuhillya" (formerly Krasnoarmiyskvuhillya, after the city's central train station) along with refining factory "Komsomolska".
 Myrnohradvuhillya
Kapitalna coal mine (formerly Stakhanov coal mine)
Tsentralna coal mine
Dymytrova coal mine
Rodynska coal mine

References

 
Cities in Donetsk Oblast
Populated places established in the Russian Empire
Cities of regional significance in Ukraine
City name changes in Ukraine
Former Soviet toponymy in Ukraine
Mining cities and regions in Ukraine
Pokrovsk Raion